The 1992–93 season was Sport Lisboa e Benfica's 89th season in existence and the club's 59th consecutive season in the top flight of Portuguese football, covering the period from 1 July 1992 to 30 June 1993. Benfica competed domestically in the Primeira Divisão and the Taça de Portugal, and participated in the UEFA Cup by finishing second in the previous season.

This season was the first after the departure of Sven-Göran Eriksson, with Tomislav Ivić succeeding the Swedish coach for a brief spell before former manager Toni took over until the end of the season. In the transfer market, the club look into strengthening their defence, after conceding 23 goals in the league in the year before, with regular starters being brought in, notably the cases of Abel Xavier, Hélder and Carlos Mozer. Also with strikers like Rui Águas and Sergei Yuran, players that could play in the hole were needed, so João Pinto and Aleksandr Mostovoi were signed. Benfica finished the league in the second place, two points behind defending champions Porto – against whom they also lost the 1991 Supertaça in a replay final – but secured a record 22nd Taça de Portugal title.

Season summary
Swedish manager Sven-Göran Eriksson left the club after three seasons, following a trophyless 1991–92 season. As his successor, Benfica brought in Croatian manager Tomislav Ivić, who had arrived in Portugal in 1987 to represent Porto and guided them to four trophies in one season. Ivić chose Shéu to be his assistant, instead of Toni, who had been Eriksson's assistant as well as Benfica's manager during Ivić's previous tenure at Porto. One of Ivić's first demands was to reduce the width of the Estádio da Luz pitch to simulate the smaller fields that the team would encounter in away games.

Benfica started the season in good form, winning the first game, but this performance was not continued through the following matches. In September, the team dropped the first points, lagging behind in the title race, and lost the 1991 Supertaça Cândido de Oliveira replay final against Porto on penalties, despite a two-goal advantage. The results did not improve as the season progressed, and an away loss to Sporting CP (the first in eight years) caused Ivić to be sacked days later and replaced by Toni. The effect was not immediate as the team suffered a compromising loss against Porto, which opened a four-point gap at the top of the league standings. After December, good results in Europe and in the Taça de Portugal helped to boost the team's morale and performance.

In January, Benfica signed Paulo Futre, the 1987 Ballon d'Or runner-up with Porto, for what the media described to be upwards of £2.4 million. Later that month, Benfica played with Porto at the Estádio das Antas for the sixth round of the Portuguese cup. Porto took the lead soon after Mozer's sending off on the 70th minute, but Benfica drew level through Aleksandr Mostovoi, with two minutes to play. The contend was decided in a replay match in Lisbon, which Benfica won 2–0 with goals from Isaías and Sergei Yuran.

Over the following months, Benfica had their best period of the season. Nonetheless, March was a difficult month as the team marginally defeated Sporting CP at home after dropping points in the title race against Farense, and were knocked out of the UEFA Cup by Roberto Baggio's and Gianluca Vialli's Juventus. In early April, Benfica closed the gap to leaders Porto to one point, after a hard-fought away win against Boavista. Ahead of the Clássico on 17 April, Porto and Benfica were tied in points, but as the match ended with a goalless draw, the title race remained open.

Entering May, Benfica reached the top of the Primeira Divisão but their campaign in the Taça de Portugal nearly came to an end in the semifinal. Trailing 1–0 to Vitória de Guimarães until the 78th minute, goals from Isaías and Rui Águas (89th minute) overturned the score and qualified Benfica for the final. On matchday 31, a 1–0 loss against Beira-Mar in Aveiro saw Benfica lose the league lead back to Porto, and a goalless away draw against Estoril in the penultimate day confirmed back-to-back league titles for Porto.

The team concluded the season on 10 June 1993 by beating Boavista 5–2 in the 1993 Taça de Portugal Final, with an inspired performance by Futre.

Competitions

Overall record

Supertaça Cândido de Oliveira

Primeira Divisão

League table

Results by round

Matches

Taça de Portugal

UEFA Cup

First round

Second round

Third round

Quarter-finals

Friendlies

Player statistics
The squad for the season consisted of the players listed in the tables below, as well as staff member Tomislav Ivic (manager) and Toni(manager).

|}

Transfers

In

Out

References

Bibliography
 
 

S.L. Benfica seasons
Benfica